David Barr (born 12 July 1946) is an Australian politician. He was the Independent Member for Manly of the New South Wales Legislative Assembly from 1999 to 2007. He succeeded Independent Peter Macdonald and served two terms before his defeat by Liberal candidate Mike Baird.

Notes

 

1946 births
Living people
Members of the New South Wales Legislative Assembly
Independent members of the Parliament of New South Wales
21st-century Australian politicians